Cork International Hotel is a hotel near Cork Airport in Cork, Ireland. It was officially opened on 1 July 2007. The hotel, which is located in the grounds of Cork Airport Business Park, was listed in the 2016 McKennas' Guide "100 Best Places to Stay in Ireland" and the Trivago "Top Hotel Awards 2015".

Cork International Hotel is a four star hotel with 145 rooms. It has 10 meeting rooms.

References

Buildings and structures in Cork (city)
Hotels in County Cork
Hotels established in 2007
Hotel buildings completed in 2007
21st-century architecture in the Republic of Ireland